
Gmina Stoczek is a rural gmina (administrative district) in Węgrów County, Masovian Voivodeship, in east-central Poland. Its seat is the village of Stoczek, which lies approximately 18 kilometres (11 mi) north-west of Węgrów and 70 km (43 mi) north-east of Warsaw.

Villages
Gmina Stoczek contains the villages and settlements of Błotki, Brzózka, Drgicz, Gajówka Wschodnia, Gajówka Zachodnia, Grabowiec, Gruszczyno, Grygrów, Huta Gruszczyno, Kalaty, Kałęczyn, Kazimierzów, Kozołupy, Majdan, Marianów, Miednik, Mrozowa Wola, Nowe Lipki, Polkowo, Stare Lipki, Stoczek, Topór, Wieliczna, Zgrzebichy and Żulin.

Neighbouring gminas
Gmina Stoczek is bordered by the gminas of Korytnica, Kosów Lacki, Liw, Łochów, Miedzna and Sadowne.

References

Polish official population figures 2006

Stoczek
Węgrów County